Handman is a surname. Notable people with the surname include:

Barbara Handman (1928–2013), American political consultant and arts activist
Lou Handman (1894–1956), American composer
Wynn Handman (1922–2020), American theatre director

See also
Handmann
Alan Hantman (born 1942), American architect